Dereköy is a village in the Sason District, Batman Province, Turkey. Its population is 615 (2021).

The hamlet of Şahinli is attached to the village.

References

Villages in Sason District